Mayo Lemie or Mayo-Lémié is one of four departments in Mayo-Kebbi Est, a region of Chad. Its capital is Guélengdeng.

Departments of Chad
Mayo-Kebbi Est Region